William Thomas Ward (born 5 May 1948) is an English drummer. He was a co-founder and the original drummer for the heavy metal band Black Sabbath. Ward helped found Black Sabbath in 1969 alongside bandmates Ozzy Osbourne (lead singer), Tony Iommi (guitarist) and Geezer Butler (bass).

Biography

Early years and Black Sabbath
Bill started to play drums as a child, listening to the big bands of the 1940s; his early major influences were Gene Krupa, Buddy Rich and Louie Bellson. Later he was influenced by drummers such as Larrie Londin, Bernard Purdie, Joe Morello, Keef Hartley, Hughie Flint, John Bonham, Ringo Starr, Jim Capaldi and Clive Bunker. In the mid-1960s Ward sang and played drums in a band called the Rest, before he and guitarist Tony Iommi played together in a band called Mythology, and upon that band's dissolution joined vocalist Ozzy Osbourne and bassist Geezer Butler, who had previously played together in a band called Rare Breed. The new band called themselves Earth, but were soon renamed Black Sabbath.

Ward's drug and alcohol use increased throughout Black Sabbath's heyday. By the late 1970s he was drinking during gigs, something he had never done before. He also began experiencing panic attacks. Ward has said he cannot remember the recording of the 1980 album Heaven and Hell due to his alcohol abuse. According to Black Sabbath bandmate Iommi, Ward disappeared on 21 August 1980, without saying goodbye, other than a telephone call to then-Black Sabbath vocalist Ronnie James Dio informing him "I'm off then, Ron." He then briefly played in a band called Max Havoc. He sat out one album (1981's Mob Rules) before returning to Black Sabbath for 1983's Born Again album. Ward once again left for health reasons before the band toured in support of Born Again. He again rejoined Black Sabbath in 1984 to record new material with David Donato but after several demo tapes, he once again left Sabbath.

Pranks

According to Tony Iommi, he and the band would often set Ward's beard on fire and perform other harmful pranks on him. On one occasion, Ward even received third-degree burns.
 In an interview with Guitar World, Iommi described it as follows:

Iommi claims that Ward almost died after a prank-gone-wrong during recording of Vol. 4 in 1972. The band were renting a Bel Air mansion belonging to John DuPont of the DuPont chemical company. The band found several spray cans of gold DuPont paint in a room of the house; finding Ward naked and unconscious after a night of heavy drinking, they thought it would be funny to cover the drummer from head to toe in gold paint. Ward soon became violently ill and had a seizure and an ambulance had to be called. The paint had blocked all of Ward's pores, which his bandmates were subsequently informed can be fatal.

Solo career
After a few years in hiatus, Ward decided to return to playing music in the late 1980s. In 1989 he went to work on a solo album, which featured a huge array of guest musicians, including former Black Sabbath bandmate Ozzy Osbourne and his guitarist, Zakk Wylde. Released in January 1990, Ward One: Along the Way showcased Ward's versatility in musical tastes and abilities; he even sang vocals on some of the songs. It would be seven years before he released his second solo album, When the Bough Breaks, in 1997.

In 2002 he released the song "Straws" as a single for charity. The song would reappear on his 2015 album Accountable Beasts.

Later career

Before the full Black Sabbath reunion, Ward and the original Sabbath had reunited twice for short sets, first for Live Aid in 1985 and then at a Costa Mesa, California Ozzy Osbourne show on 15 November 1992. Sabbath, with Judas Priest singer Rob Halford replacing Ronnie James Dio who had recently left the band, opened the show for Osbourne. The Ozzy Osbourne band (Osbourne, Zakk Wylde, Mike Inez, Randy Castillo and John Sinclair) then did a full set before Osbourne was reunited with Iommi, Butler and Ward for four numbers.

Ward made a brief return to the band for a South American tour in 1994 with Tony Martin fronting, before finally rejoining the band for the two shows at the Birmingham NEC, England on 4 and 5 December 1997, which made up the Reunion album. When what was billed as the original line-up reunited for the Ozzfest tour in 1997, Mike Bordin played drums.

Ward was forced to skip all but the last two Black Sabbath appearances in 1998 while he recovered from a heart attack suffered during the tour rehearsals that May. As the band rehearsed, Ward stopped and asked if he could lie down for a spell. He then asked for his assistant and informed the band that his arm had gone numb. Iommi and Butler then left for a short time, not knowing the severity of Ward's condition. Outside, they saw an ambulance pass but weren't aware what was happening. Upon returning to the rehearsal space a short time later, a frantic Osbourne informed them "Bill has had a heart attack! Bill has had a heart attack!" As was the case in 1980, he was replaced at short notice by Vinny Appice, although this time it was always intended to be a temporary absence for Ward, health permitting.

In 2000, Ward participated in a partial Black Sabbath reunion of sorts, joining Iommi and Osbourne to record the track "Who's Fooling Who" for Iommi's first solo album.

Since mid-2002, Ward has done a monthly internet-only radio show named Rock 50 on radio station WPMD from Cerritos College in California. Ward plays a variety of metal, hard rock, and some classic rock.

Brief reunion with Black Sabbath
In October 2006, news leaked that Ward would be reuniting with Tony Iommi, Geezer Butler and Ronnie James Dio for a tour though under the moniker Heaven & Hell. However, Ward later decided not to participate in the tour or continue participation in the band because of musical differences with "a couple of the other bandmembers" and a reported concern about extended touring. His spot in the band was filled by Vinny Appice.

On 11 November 2011, Iommi, Butler, Osbourne, and Ward announced that they were reuniting to record a new album with producer Rick Rubin and to start touring in 2012. In February 2012, however, Ward left before work commenced on 13, the first studio recording to include original band members Iommi, Osbourne and Butler since the live album Reunion (1998), which contained two new studio tracks. Ward said that he had failed to reach an agreement regarding his contract. However, he did later admit that his weight would have been an issue in a 2013 tour. Osbourne also suggested in an open letter that Ward's decision not to take part was down to his health. In April 2015, Ward criticised Osbourne on his Facebook fan page via a letter to his and the band's fans. This prompted a rebuttal from Osbourne on his Facebook page:

Rage Against the Machine and Audioslave drummer Brad Wilk filled in for Ward for 13.

Ward's surgery on his shoulder prevented him from playing drums again until May 2014, delaying his third studio album Accountable Beasts. He had also expressed a desire to tour behind the album once it is released, provided that sales were acceptable.

Ward reunited with Sabbath members Tony Iommi and Geezer Butler to accept the "Lifetime Achievement" award at the May 2015 Ivor Novello Awards.

In 2016, Ward debuted with a new band called "Day of Errors", which played its first gig in June that year at Gaslamp in Long Beach, California and also features Joe Amodea on guitar/vocals and Kill Devil Hill singer Jason "Dewey" Bragg on vocals.

Ward was due to play a string of dates with his new band in December 2017 but had to cancel these when he was hospitalised with heart problems in November.

He once again reunited with Iommi and Butler in Los Angeles in May 2019, as Black Sabbath were awarded a Lifetime Achievement Grammy. Though Sabbath did not perform, Rival Sons performed a set of their songs for the occasion. A short time later, Osbourne said in an interview that he wants to play one last show with the band's original line-up. Ward announced three weeks later on his Instagram that he loved all three of his former Black Sabbath bandmates very much and was open-minded to playing a final show with them. The last show Black Sabbath played was on 4 February 2017 in their native Birmingham, with Tommy Clufetos on drums instead of Ward. He also says, "I would love to do a studio album with Sabbath, with all the original members. I'm just saying that I'm just floating that out there – I haven't talked to anybody about that or anything else."

Personal life
Ward has two sons, Nigel and Aron, and one daughter, Emily.

According to his Black Sabbath bandmates Tony Iommi and Ozzy Osbourne, Ward has dramatically changed his lifestyle since Black Sabbath's 1970s and early 80s heyday. Iommi says he stopped smoking, gave up alcohol, became a vegan, and does not use drugs of any kind. Osbourne says that Ward has been sober for approximately 30 years. However, more recently Osbourne has criticised Ward's health, describing him in 2013 as "incredibly overweight" and suggesting that he would have been unable to drum for Black Sabbath had he stayed in the band following their 2011 reunion, given his physical condition, although Ward himself has insisted his health has not affected his ability to play the drums.

Ward later admitted he underwent gastrointestinal surgery in 2013, and is still recovering. "Currently my health is not bad but it's certainly not good enough to play in any band, never mind Black Sabbath." By 2021, he admitted that he was no longer able to play his drum parts for Black Sabbath, but was open to recording another studio album with them.

Ward stated in an interview he "lost a friend" in Osbourne after his statements about Ward's health in 2012, but maintained contact with Butler and Iommi. However, they appear to have reconciled since then, as Osbourne named Ward as one of the people that kept in touch with him during his health problems in 2019.

In 2016, Ward expressed his distaste for religion saying that he grew up in a "heathen" family and did not believe in a "fire and brimstone god [...] bloody rubbish!" He did however enjoy singing in Sunday church choirs growing up.

Influence 
Drumming website Totaldrumsets has listed Ward among "The 100 Most Influential Drummers Ever!" and has defined him "the mastermind behind the unholy birth of heavy metal drumming".

In 2016, he was ranked 42nd in Rolling Stone's list 100 Greatest Drummers of All Time.

Equipment
Ward uses Tama drums, Sabian cymbals, Vic Firth drumsticks, and Gibraltar hardware.

Discography

with Black Sabbath
 Black Sabbath (1970)
 Paranoid (1970)
 Master of Reality (1971)
 Vol. 4 (1972)
 Sabbath Bloody Sabbath (1973)
 Sabotage (1975)
 Technical Ecstasy (1976)
 Never Say Die! (1978)
Heaven and Hell (1980)
Live at Last (1980)
Born Again (1983)
Reunion (1998)
Past Lives (2002)

with Ozzy Osbourne
 Live & Loud (1993)

with Tony Iommi
Iommi (2000)

Solo 
 Ward One: Along the Way (1990)
When the Bough Breaks (1997)
Straws (single) (2002)
The Dark Half Hour (web mix) (2004)
Accountable Beasts (2015)

with Bill Ward Band 

 Arrows (song dedicated to the victims of the 2017 Las Vegas shooting) (2019)
 Once This Was A Road (2019)
 Powder on the Moon (2020)
 Bombers "The Remake" (a remake of "Bombers Can Open Bomb Bays"), featuring drummer Walter Earl (2020)

with Day of Errors 

 Blaspheming at Creation (2017) - Day of Errors/Blaspheming at Creation
 Dark (2019)
 Ghost Train (2019)

with The Mezmerist 
The Innocent, The Forsaken, The Guilty (demo) (1983)

Compilations 

 We Sold Our Soul for Rock & Roll (1975)
 The Best of Black Sabbath (2000)
 Symptom of the Universe: The Original Black Sabbath 1970–1978 (2002)
 Black Box: The Complete Original Black Sabbath 1970–1978 (2004)
 Greatest Hits 1970–1978 (2006)
 Greatest Hits (2009)
 Iron Man: The Best of Black Sabbath (2012)
 The Ultimate Collection (2016)
 The Ten Year War (2017)

Tribute
Nativity in Black: A Tribute to Black Sabbath (1994)

References

External links

 
 
 February '09 Bill Ward Interview with Jarrod Dicker

1948 births
Living people
Black Sabbath members
English expatriates in the United States
English heavy metal drummers
English rock drummers
Musicians from Birmingham, West Midlands
Blues rock musicians